Haeju Ch'ŏngnyŏn station is the central railway station of Haeju City, South Hwanghae Province, North Korea. Haeju Ch'ŏngnyŏn station is the terminus of Hwanghae Ch'ŏngnyŏn Line and the origin station of Ongjin Line.

References

Railway stations in North Korea